This article charts a list of countries by importance of religion.

 Methodology                                                                     
The table below is based upon global Gallup Poll in 2009 research which asked "Is religion important in your daily life?". Percentages for "yes" and "no" answers are listed below; they often do not add up to 100% because some answered "don't know" or did not answer.

 Countries/districts

 See also 
 Demographics of atheism
 Demographics of religion
 Irreligion by country
 Religions by country
 Religiosity and intelligence
 Wealth and religionGeneral:'''
 List of religious populations

References

Lists by country
Religion by country
Religious practices